The Ghana women's national handball team is the national handball team of Ghana.

African Championship record
1985 – 9th place

References

External links
IHF profile

Women's national handball teams
National sports teams of Ghana